Alejandro González (born 7 February 1989) is a Colombian former professional tennis player. He has a career-high singles ranking of World No. 70 achieved on the 9 June 2014.

Career 
Alejandro Gonzalez won his first singles title on the ATP Challenger Tour at the Ecuador tournament Challenger ATP de Salinas Diario Expreso in March 2013, defeating Argentine Renzo Olivo in three sets in the final. Previously, he had already won seven singles and six doubles tournaments on the circuit Future ITF and three doubles tournaments ATP Challenger Series. He followed this up with two more Challenger titles the same year, the Seguros Bolívar Open Medellín defeating Argentinian Guido Andreozzi in two sets, and the first edition of the São Paulo Challenger de Tênis, defeating another Argentinian Eduardo Schwank taking his tally to three Challenger wins in 2013.

ATP Tour
In July 2013 Gonzalez received a direct entry to his first ATP World Tour event, the 2013 Claro Open Colombia, however he lost in the first round to Frenchman Adrian Mannarino in three sets.

Gonzalez made his Grand Slam tournament debut at the beginning of 2014 at the Australian Open, receiving direct entry for the first time. He was drawn against third seed David Ferrer, however lost in straight sets to the Spaniard.

He also entered the doubles draw, teaming up with Argentine Carlos Berlocq. The pair were drawn against local wildcard pairing of Benjamin Mitchell and Jordan Thompson, however they lost in three sets despite taking the opening set. Gonzalez received a direct entry to two consecutive ATP Tour events in South America, losing in the first round of the Royal Guard Open to Italian Paolo Lorenzi, followed by another opening round loss, at the Copa Claro in Buenos Aires, this time to Frenchman Jérémy Chardy. He followed this with an appearance at the inaugural rio Open in Brazil, losing once again in the first round to Pablo Cuevas of Uruguay. The following week, he recorded four losses in a row, losing to Potito Starace of Italy at the Brasil Open.

At the 2014 BNP Paribas Open in Indian Wells, California, Gonzalez received his first ever entry to a Masters 1000 tournament. Here he recorded his first ever ATP tour-level wins of his career, defeating Adrian Mannarino in the first round, and backing that up with a win over 31st seed Ivan Dodig of Croatia. His third round opponent was world number 2 and eventual champion Novak Djokovic was a significant step up from his previous opponents. He took a set off the former world number one before succumbing 1-6 6-3 1-6.

Challenger and Futures finals

Singles: 26 (11–15)

Doubles: 26 (11–15)

Performance timelines

Singles
Current till 2015 US Open.

Doubles
This table is current through the 2014 Australian Open.

Notes

References

External links
 
 
 
 Alejandro González at the 2019 Pan American Games

1989 births
Living people
Colombian expatriate sportspeople in Brazil
Colombian male tennis players
Sportspeople from Rio de Janeiro (city)
Tennis players at the 2011 Pan American Games
Pan American Games competitors for Colombia
Tennis players at the 2019 Pan American Games
Central American and Caribbean Games medalists in tennis
Central American and Caribbean Games bronze medalists for Colombia
21st-century Colombian people